Be Mad is a Spanish free television channel, belongs to Mediaset España and was launched on 21 April 2016. Its programming is about cinema.

History 
In October 2015, Mediaset España was announced as one of the winning companies of a high definition digital terrestrial television license. Initially, the owner company transmitted HD versions of the Boing and Energy channels on that signal. In March 2016, it was announced that this signal would be occupied by a new channel called Be Mad, which finally began broadcasting on 21 April 2016.

Programming 
Between April 2016 and August 2022 channel's programming was based on topics related to sports, adventure and action. There were several programmatic blocks in which the different contents of the channel were categorized: Be Mad Travel, Be Mad Nature, Be Mad Mechanic, Be Mad Planet, Be Mad Investigation, Be Mad Extreme, Be Mad Food, Be Mad Live!, Be Mad History, Be Mad Movies, Be Mad Science, Be Mad Mystery and Be Mad Sports. Most of the channel's programming was based on content that had previously been broadcast on Telecinco or Cuatro, which met the thematic criteria related to the Be Mad idea.

As of September 2022, the programming of Be Mad was reformed, so it became a channel dedicated to cinema, taking advantage of the agreements that Mediaset España has with various production companies such as Walt Disney Pictures, Sony Pictures, Universal Pictures, Warner Bros. or StudioCanal, in addition to the films made by Telecinco Cinema.

References

External links

Channels of Mediaset España Comunicación
Television stations in Spain
Television channels and stations established in 2016
Men's interest channels
Spanish-language television stations